Xylecata druna is a moth of the subfamily Arctiinae first described by Charles Swinhoe in 1904. It is found in Cameroon, the Democratic Republic of the Congo, Equatorial Guinea, Gabon and Ghana.

References

Nyctemerina
Moths described in 1904